"Devil's Spoke" is a single by Laura Marling. It was released on March 12, 2010 as the second single from her second album I Speak Because I Can. The song peaked at number 97 on the UK Singles Chart.

Music video
A music video to accompany the release of "Devil's Spoke" was first released onto YouTube on 13 February 2010 at a total length of two minutes and fifty-eight seconds.

Track listing

Chart performance

Release history

References

2010 singles
Laura Marling songs
2010 songs
Virgin Records singles